The 2020 SANFL Women's League season was the fourth season of the SANFL Women's League (SANFLW). The season commenced on 14 February and concluded with the Grand Final on 23 August. The competition was contested by eight clubs, all of whom were affiliated with clubs from the men's South Australian National Football League (SANFL). Following the fourth round of competition, the season was suspended for over three months due to the impact of the COVID-19 pandemic, though upon resumption in June the season continued uninterrupted and concluded in late August 2020.

Clubs

Ladder

Finals series

First semi-final

Second semi-final

Preliminary final

Grand Final

References 

SANFL Women's League
SANFLW
SANFLW season 2020
SANFLW season 2020
SANFLW season 2020